Gnutz is a municipality in the district of Rendsburg-Eckernförde, in Schleswig-Holstein, Germany.

The location of Gnutz is south of the nearby municipality of Bargstedt or Nortorf, but north of Aukrug, and west of Timmaspe.

References

Municipalities in Schleswig-Holstein
Rendsburg-Eckernförde